Enterprise, Mississippi may refer to:

 Enterprise, Clarke County, Mississippi, a town in Clarke County, Mississippi
 Enterprise, Union County, Mississippi, an unincorporated community in Union County, Mississippi